Richard Marazano (born 27 January 1971) is a French cartoonist.

His work has been published in many European countries including France, England, Germany, Spain, the Netherlands, Belgium, Swiss, Italy as well as worldwide in the United States, China and Japan.

Biography
Marazano was born in Fontenay-aux-Roses, near Paris. 
After short scientific studies, he was introduced by artist Moebius to several comics publishers.

He was formerly pushed into comics by artist Jean Giraud, better known as Moebius, who advised him for a few years and introduced him to several publishers.

He also collaborated to the atelier Sanzot, an Atelier gathering several French artists in Angoulême.

Meeting and collaborating with Victor Delafuente and Antonio Parras in Paris had a major influence over his art and inking. Despite being also a penciller, Marazano mostly works as writer with other artists.

In 2003 he created Cuervos, a series set in Colombia and telling the deeds of a killer in the drug traffic of the Medellín Cartel. The series artist was Michel Durand, and it was acclaimed by the critics and nominated as best story in the international comics convention in Angoulême.

In 2007-2008 he wrote the science fiction trilogy The Chimpanzee Complex, with art by Jean-Michel Ponzio which received a public success.

Other series by Marazano include the fantasy adventures, "le monde de Milo", and the retro scifi "Les trois fantômes de Tesla"  both series which also received critical and public success in Europe.  Other works noticeable work include "the expedition" with art by Marcelo Frusin, SAM With Shang Xiao which became a success in France and China) or Trelawney, with Spanish artist Alfonso Font, telling the story of the 19th-century corsair Edward John Trelawney.

The sf-fantasy-thriller tetralogy Le Protocole Pélican (The Pelican Protocol), published in 2011-2013, also featured art by Ponzio.

In 2014 he has been following painting teaching by American Painter  Max Ginsburg at the Art Student League in New-York.

Awards
 Cuervos - 2006 Carolus Quintus Award  
Cuervos - 2006 for best comics script adaptable into a movie in Monaco's Cinema and literature convention
 The Chimpanzee Complex - 2007 best album award in Lyon's comic's convention.
 The Chimpanzee Complex - 2008 best album and best story in Le Bourget Museum comics convention
  Genetiks - 2008 Bob Morane Award for best "Francophone" scifi album
 Chaabi, la révolte - 2008 "interfestival" Award for best album in Chambéry comics convention
 Chaabi, la révolte - 2009 "Bonne mine" Award for best album in Decines comic's convention.
 S.A.M. book 1 - 2012 best teenage album in Angoulême's international comics convention.
 S.A.M. book 1 - 2012 best Youth album by "Union Nationnale Culture et Bibliothèque pour tous".
 Otaku Blue - 2013 Bronze Award at the 6th International MANGA Award 
 Le monde de milo - 2013 Award for best youth comics by the readers of Mickey magazine in France.
 Yin & the Dragon book 1 -  2017 Award "À l'ombre du grand arbre".
 Yin & the Dragon book 1 - 2017 Award for best youth album un Sollies comics convention.
The Three Ghosts of Tesla - 2018 Special double "Grande Ourse" award for best writing and best drawing in Andenne Convention, Belgium.

Published works

As artist
Le Bataillon des lâches (2000)
Le syndrome d'Abel (3 volumes, 2005-2013), on a script by Xavier Dorison.

As writer
Humain trop humain (1995; art by Éric Derian) 
 Sidney & Howell, (2 volumes in 1997-1998; art by Nicolas Moraes)
 Zéro absolu (in English as Absolute Zero; 3 volumes in 1997-1999; art by Christophe Bec]])
 Tequila Desperados (1998; art by Jean-Claude Cassini)
Le Bataillon des lâches (2000) 
 Dusk  (2 volumes in 2000-2007; art by Christian Demetter)
Vampires (2001; art by Tommy Lee Edwards) 
Les Contes de par-ci par-là (2002; only colors)
 Cuervos  (4 volumes in 2003-2009; art by Michel Durand)
 Cos & Mos  (2 volumes in 2004-2005; art by Abel)
 Les Mémoires d'un gentilhomme corsaire (in English as Trelawney, 2005; art by Alfonso Font)
 Blue Space  (Volume 1 in 2006, redrawn and re-released in 2009 with volume 2; art by Chris Lamquet)
 Chaabi, la révolte  (3 volumes in 2007-2011; art by Xavier Delaporte)
 The Chimpanzee Complex  (3 volumes in 2007-2008; art by Jean-Michel Ponzio)
 Genetiks (3 volumes in 2007-2011; art by Jean-Michel Ponzio)
Aguirre, le principe de liberté (2008; art by Gabriel Delmas)
 Cutie B. (2 volumes in 2008; art by Yishan Li)
 Guerrero (2 volumes in 2008-2009; art by Camille Legendre)
Jérusalem (2008; art  by Patrick Pion)
Minik (2008; art by Hippolyte)
 Le Syndrome d'Abel (3 volumes in 2008-2015;; script by Xavier Dorison)
 Eco Warriors (2 volumes in 2009-2010; art by Chris Lamquet)
 Héloïse de Montfort  (3 volumes in 2010-2012; art by Alfonso Font)
 Le Rêve du papillon (4 volumes in 2010-2014; art by Yin Luo)
 Le Protocole Pélican  (4 volumes in 2011-2013; art by Jean-Michel Ponzio)
 Alcyon (3 volumes in 2014-2016; art by Christophe Ferreira )
 Chroniques de la guerre civile (3 volumes in 2016-2018; art by Jean-Michel Ponzio)
 S.A.M.  (3 of 4 volumes in 2011-2015; art by Xiao Shang)
 L'Expédition  (3 of 4 volumes published in 2012-2014; art by Marcelo Frusin)
 Otaku blue (2 volumes in 2012-2013; art by Malo Kerfriden)
 Le monde de Milo (6 of 10 volumes in 2013-2019; art by Christophe Ferreira)
 Yin et le Dragon (3 volumes in 2016-2019; art by Xu Yao)
 Fleur de Bambou (2 volumes in 2016-2019; art by Cat Zaza)
 Les trois fantômes de Tesla (2 of 3 volumes in 2015-2019; art by Guilhem)
 Zarathustra (1 of 3 volumes in 2017; art by Amad Mir)

Press 
 Cos & Mos, (Shorts stories in Pif Gadget), Script : Richard Marazano - Art : Abel
 Les Mémoires d’un gentilhomme corsaire, (Shorts stories in Pif Gadget) Script : Richard Marazano - Art : Alfonso Font
 Sidney & Howell, (In Lanfeust Mag), Script : Richard Marazano - Art : Nicolas Moraes
 Gargantua et Pantagruel (short story in Je bouquine, Bayard Press) : Script : Richard Marazano - Art : Mazan
 Le masque de fer (short story in Je bouquine, Bayard Press) : Script : Richard Marazano - Art : D. Bertail
 Histoires comme ça (short story in Je bouquine, Bayard Press) : Script : Richard Marazano - Art : Mazan
 Conte de Noël  (short story in faille temporelle) : Script : Richard Marazano - Art : Mazan
 Xibalba, le royaume de la peur (short story in Bodoï) : Script : Richard Marazano - Art : B. Springer

External links
 
Richard Marazano at Bedetheque 

Richard Marazano at Lambiek  
Richard Marazano at Sceneario.com 

Writers from Paris
Living people
1971 births
French comics artists
French comics writers
French male writers